is a mountain located on the border of Iwakuni, Yamaguchi Prefecture, and Yoshika, Shimane Prefecture, Japan. 

It is the highest mountain in Yamaguchi Prefecture.

References

Mountains of Yamaguchi Prefecture
Mountains of Shimane Prefecture